Christine Sharon Grant is an American chemical engineer who is the Associate Dean of Faculty Advancement at North Carolina State University. Her research considers surface and environmental science. She is the 2022 President of the American Institute of Chemical Engineers.

Early life and education 
Grant was born in upstate New York. Her father taught music and her mother taught  science, and she grew up doing science experiments in her home and garden. Grant took part in the Program to Increase Minority Engineering Graduates (PIMEG) at General Electric, which first introduced her to careers in technology. She earned her bachelor's degree at Brown University, where she was in the second cohort of students to major in chemical engineering. As an undergraduate student, she was President of the Brown University National Society of Black Engineers. She moved to Georgia Tech for her graduate studies. She completed her doctoral research in 1989, during which she studied electro-osmotic dewatering of ultrafine minerals.

Research and career 
Grant studies the mechanisms that underpin fouling and decontamination. Her work investigates the chemical and transport processes that occur at the solid-liquid interface, and drive the formation and removal of deposits. Amongst the industrial areas considered by Grant are the removal of organics from glass, the removal of calcium compounds from stainless steel and the deposition of lubricants in disk drive assemblies. She has demonstrated that additives can be used to reduce the degradation and aggregation of lubricants at high temperatures. She joined the faculty at North Carolina State University in 1989. She was one of the first African-American women to be made a full Professor of Chemical Engineering.

Academic service 
Grant is committed to improving diversity and equity in chemical engineering. She has been honored for her work as a mentor and educator. She was named the first ever Associate Dean of Faculty Advancement and Special Initiatives at North Carolina State University in 2008 and still serves in this position. In this capacity she started mentoring programs, oversaw initiatives to widen participation and created "Faculty Development Television", a professional development program for members of staff. Grant is the founder of STEM Resilience, an organization that seeks to support marginalized groups in science, technology and engineering.

Grant has held various leadership positions in the American Institute of Chemical Engineers (AIChE): she was the first African-American woman to be elected Fellow of the society and has served as Chair of the Minority Affairs Committee and on the Board of Directors. She was elected President 2021.

Grant is also a director of the Broadening Participation in Engineering (BPE) and Historically Black Colleges and Universities - Excellence in Research (HBCU - EiR) programs at the National Science Foundation (NSF).

Awards and honors 
 American Association for the Advancement of Science Mentor Award
 American Institute of Chemical Engineers Pioneers of Diversity Award
Fellow of the American Institute of Chemical Engineers
 American Chemical Society Stanley C. Israel Regional Award
 Winifred Burks-Houck Professional Leadership Award from the National Organization for the Professional Advancement of Black Chemists and Chemical Engineers (NOBCChE)
National Organization for the Professional Advancement of Black Chemists and Chemical Engineers Professional Leadership Award
 American Institute of Chemical Engineers Pioneers of Diversity Award
 National Organization for the Professional Advancement of Black Chemists and Chemical Engineers Joseph N. Cannon Award
 American Institute of Chemical Engineers William W. Grimes Award for Excellence in Chemical Engineering
Inducted into Sigma Xi Scientific Research Society
Council for Chemical Research (CCR) Diversity Award
Selected to participate in 12th Annual US Frontiers of Engineering Symposium by the National Academy of Engineering (NAE)
National Academy of Engineering - CASEE Boeing Senior Fellowship
National Consortium for Graduate Degrees for Minorities in Engineering (GEM) Distinguished Alumni Academic Award
NSF Presidential Award for Excellence in Science, Math and Engineering Mentoring (PAESMEM)

Selected publications 

 
 
  
Decuir-Cunby, Jessica T.; Grant, Christine; Gregory, Bradley. (January 2013). "Exploring career trajectories for women of color in engineering: The experiences of African American and Latina engineering professors". Journal of Women and Minorities in Science and Engineering. 19 (3): 209–225. doi:10.1615/JWomenMinorScienEng.2013005769.

References 

Living people
Year of birth missing (living people)
American chemical engineers
African-American women academics
American women academics
21st-century African-American scientists
African-American women scientists
Brown University School of Engineering alumni
North Carolina State University faculty
Georgia Tech alumni
21st-century African-American women
20th-century African-American academics
20th-century American academics
20th-century African-American scientists
21st-century African-American academics
21st-century American academics